Krishna Kaul, known mononymously as Krishna (stylised now as KR$NA; previously as Krsna) and formerly as YoungProzpekt, is an Indian rapper. He was one of the earliest rappers to emerge in the Indian hip hop scene in the mid-2000s under the stage name Prozpekt. He was briefly featured in the 2019 Bollywood film Gully Boy as himself. He is known for his writing and technical skills as a rapper, along with his infamous beefs in the Desi Hip-Hop scene.

Early life 
Krishna Kaul was born on 4 October 1987 to a Kashmiri Pandit family in Delhi. Very less information is available about his family background. He spent a part of his childhood in South London, where he was raised and schooled for a few years. Kaul started rapping at the age of fourteen in an effort to blend in with other children at his school in London.

Career 
Kaul started recording and releasing songs on his MySpace page in 2006, by 2008 he had gained a small local fanbase in New Delhi and racked up features with artists in the U.S.A. and Canada.  His first shot of success came with the release of the music video for "Kaisa Mera Desh" in 2010, becoming the first Indian hip hop song on YouTube and earning a #2 ranking as one of the most watched music videos in India overnight following its release. He also released a song titled "Vijay" in collaboration with international NGO Save The Children in 2013.

After sporadic underground releases, Kaul switched from Prozpekt to his current stage name KR$NA after signing a record deal with Universal Music in 2013. In May 2014, he released his debut album Sellout, an all-English effort on Universal Music with its lead single "Last Night" peaking at #5 on the Vh1 Music Charts in India. Kaul became the first hip hop artist in India to do a five-city album tour with a band. Following this, the music video for the title song "Sellout" was released but failed to make a large impact due to lacklustre marketing and shrinking label budgets.

After a 2-year hiatus, Kaul made his return in 2016 with his Hindi release "Vyanjan". Following the success of the song, he signed to the artist management agency DNH Artists (now Kalamkaar) in 2017 and became a partner in 2018, with the likes of Ankit Khanna and Raftaar.

In 2020, Kaul accused the IPL and Disney+ Hotstar of permitting the plagiarism of his 2017 song "Dekh Kaun Aaya Wapas" when creating the 2020 IPL anthem "Ayenge Hum Wapas", an allegation which was dismissed by composer Pranav Ajayrao Malpe. Kaul responded by stating that "his team[...], will take the legal route and approach Disney+ Hotstar, which commissioned the song".

In the month of January 2021, Kaul was featured on American rapper Hi-Rez's song "Crossroads" along with Royce da 5'9". Later in July, another collaboration with Hi-Rez was released, titled "Playground" which also featured former Slaughterhouse member, KXNG Crooked. His collaboration in Hi-Rez's song "Overdrive", was released in November 2021, featuring A-F-R-O, Joell Ortiz, Bizzy Bone, Tech N9ne and Twista. The music videos were released on Hi-Rez's YouTube channel. In 2022, he featured on Karan Aujla's song "Ykwim".

Discography

Albums

EPs

Singles and collaborations

References

External links 
 
 KRSNA at YouTube
 

Indian rappers
Living people
21st-century Indian singers
Singers from Delhi
21st-century Indian male singers
1987 births
Kashmiri Pandits
Indian people of Kashmiri descent